This is a list of notable webcomic creators.

Webcomic creators

Traditional comics creators

Various traditional comic artists have created notable webcomics over the years.

 Scott Adams started integrating the World Wide Web for his Dilbert comics in the late 1990s.
 Slam Dunk-creator Takehiko Inoue started releasing his webcomic Buzzer Beater in 1997.
 Scott McCloud created various experimental webcomics in the late 1990s and early 2000s, including The Morning Improv and The Right Number.
 Aaron William's Nodwick and PS238 debuted in print before moving online in 2001 and 2006, respectively.
 Phil and Kaja Foglio moved their long-running comic book series Girl Genius to a webcomic format in 2005.
 Stuart and Kathryn Immonen co-authored Moving Pictures in the late 2000s.
 David Gallaher and Steve Ellis created High Moon for Zuda in 2007.
 Cameron Stewart started working on Sin Titulo in 2007.
 Warren Ellis created FreakAngels with artist Paul Duffield in 2008.
 Víctor Santos started his webcomic series Polar in 2012.
 Brian K. Vaughan and Marcos Martín created The Private Eye in 2013.
 Jason Shiga began posting Demon in 2014.

 
webcomic creators